Christopher Wasasala (born 31 December 1994) is a Fijian footballer who plays as a midfielder for Fijian club Labasa and the Fiji national team.

Club career
Before joining Labasa Wasasala played his youth football with Labasa Muslim College. In 2012, at the age of 17, he joined Labasa Youth before making his debut for the first team in 2013. In 2017 he moved to Lautoka. In January 2018, he moved back to Labasa. In January 2018 he was called as one of the eleven biggest talents in Oceania according to OceaniaFC.com

National team
In 2015 Wasasala was called up for the Fiji national under-23 football team to take part in the Four Nation’s Friendship Cup, where he won the golden boot by scoring two goals, and the 2015 Pacific Games. The Pacific games were a huge success for Fiji. Not only because they won by 38 goals to nil against the Federated States of Micronesia but also because they won the games in the final after penalty's against Vanuatu which meant that Fiji had qualified for the 2016 Summer Olympics for the first time in history. In January and February 2016, Wasasala joined the Fiji team for a preparation tour in Spain. After the tour however it was announced that Wasasala was not part of the final squad for the 2016 Summer Olympics.
Wasasala made his debut for the Fiji national football team on May 25, 2017, in a 1–1 draw against the Solomon Islands. In 2019, he was selected for the 2019 Pacific Games. Fiji won a bronze medal.

International goals
Scores and results list Fiji's goal tally first.

Personal life
Wasasala hails from Nadawa, Suva and besides football is part of the Fiji Military Airforce.

References

Fijian footballers
Labasa F.C. players
Lautoka F.C. players
Fiji international footballers
Living people
1994 births
Association football midfielders